Michelino, stage name of Michele Gramazio (1937 – 27 December 2010) was an Italian singer.

Michele Gramazio stage named "Michelino" was born in  Lucera, Italy in 1937 but in the 1940s Gramazio moved to Rome. He was amongst the first Italian artists to adopt Latin American music styles, he was considered the Italian father of the cha-cha-cha, mainly thanks to the success of the song "Cha cha cha della segretaria", a cover of  Pepe Luis' "Cha cha cha de las segretarias", which ranked at the sixth place on the Italian hit parade. Michelino was also well known for the song "La pachanga", which charted #9 on the hit parade.

References

External links  
 Michelino at Discogs

1937 births
2010 deaths
People from Lucera
Italian pop singers
20th-century Italian  male singers
Spanish-language singers of Italy